The 2012 Tashkent Open was a tennis tournament played on outdoor hard courts. It was the 14th edition of the Tashkent Open, and was part of the WTA International tournaments of the 2012 WTA Tour. It took place at the Tashkent Tennis Center in Tashkent, Uzbekistan, from September 10 through September 16, 2012.

Singles main-draw entrants

 1 Rankings are as of August 27, 2012

Other entrants
The following players received wildcards into the singles main draw:
  Nigina Abduraimova
  Vlada Ekshibarova
  Sabina Sharipova

The following players received entry from the qualifying draw:
  Ekaterina Bychkova
  Anna Chakvetadze
  Vesna Dolonc
  Donna Vekić

The following player received entry as a lucky loser:
  Monica Puig

Withdrawals
  Kateryna Bondarenko
  Stéphanie Foretz Gacon
  Polona Hercog
  Shahar Pe'er
  Ksenia Pervak

Doubles main-draw entrants

Seeds

 1 Rankings are as of August 27, 2012

Other entrants
The following pairs received wildcards into the doubles main draw:
  Nigina Abduraimova /  Ksenia Lykina
  Daria Gavrilova /  Sabina Sharipova

Retirements
  Anna Chakvetadze (back injury)

Champions

Singles

  Irina-Camelia Begu def.  Donna Vekić, 6–4, 6–4
 It was Begu's 1st title of the year and 1st of her career

Doubles

  Paula Kania /  Polina Pekhova def.  Anna Chakvetadze /  Vesna Dolonc, 6–2, ret.

External links
 Official website

 
Tashkent Open
Tashkent Open
2012 in Uzbekistani sport